Force Blue (formerly Big Roi) is a trawler-expedition style luxury yacht built by Royal Denship in 2002. She is the world's 78th-largest superyacht

Design
Built in 2002 by Royal Denship, she was designed by Ole Steen Knudsen and Tom Fexas as part of Royal Denship's "expedition" series, that included Turmoil and Big Aron. She was commissioned by Roy Speer, the founder and owner of the Home Shopping Network.

Briatore
Purchased from Speer by Italian motorsports entrepreneur Flavio Briatore for £68.2m, she was given a refitted interior designed by Celeste Dell'Anna, and given a blue exterior.

Force Blue was seized by Italian Customs in May 2010 in La Spezia, near Genoa. On the authority of a local prosecutor, the state claims that the vessel's owners, Autumn Sailing Ltd, that there was outstanding Value Added Tax owing which should have been paid on the fuel used by the yacht. The amount evaded was estimated to be around five million euros.

See also
 Yachting

References

External links
 Pictures/details of Force Blue at Monacoeye.com
 Information to Charter this Yacht

Motor yachts
Ships built in Denmark
2002 ships